Goravan, is a village in the Vedi Municipality of the Ararat Province of Armenia, just south of the Vedi river, which separates the town of Vedi from Goravan.

Nature 
Goravan state nature reservation is located in the vicinity of Goravan village.

References 

World Gazeteer: Armenia – World-Gazetteer.com

Populated places in Ararat Province